Georgios Kalafatakis (alternate spelling: Giorgos) (born November 9, 1958) is a Greek professional basketball coach and a retired professional basketball player.

Playing career
Kalafatakis played club basketball with the Greek clubs Ampelokipoi, Ionikos Nikaias, and Apollon Nea Smyrni. He became the first Greek player to ever make a 3 point shot in an official game, while he was a member of Ionikos Nikaias. He became the first Greek player to make a 3 pointer in an official game, in a 74–77 loss against the Israeli Super League club Hapoel Haifa, in a 1984–85 FIBA Korać Cup game.

Coaching career
Kalafatakis began his coaching career in the 1984–85 season, in the Greek minors, with Ampelokipoi. He eventually led Ampelokipoi to be promoted to the top-tier level Greek Basket League, after five consecutive promotions. In 1995, he became the head coach of the Greek club Irakleio Crete.

In the 1998–99 season, he became Greek club AEK Athens' head coach, and with the club, he coached in the European-wide 2nd-tier level FIBA Saporta Cup. He also coached various other Greek clubs, some of which include: Apollon Patras, Panionios, Panellinios, where he coached in the 2nd-tier level EuroCup's 2007–08 season, PAOK, and Iraklis. He also coached the Cypriot club Keravnos Strovolos.

Personal life
Kalafatakis is married to Renia Stavrakopoulou, who is the sister of the former Greek professional basketball player, Tzanis Stavrakopoulos. The couple's daughter, Angeliki, is a volleyball player.

References

External links
Eurobasket.com Coach Profile
The top of the Greek Benches: Georgios Kalafatakis 

1958 births
Living people
A.E.L. 1964 B.C. coaches
AEK B.C. coaches
Ampelokipoi B.C. coaches
Ampelokipoi B.C. players
Apollon Patras B.C. coaches
Dafni B.C. coaches
Ethnikos Piraeus B.C. coaches
Greek basketball coaches
Greek men's basketball players
Ikaros B.C. coaches
Ilysiakos B.C. coaches
Ionikos N.F. B.C. coaches
Ionikos Nikaias B.C. players
Irakleio B.C. coaches
Iraklis Thessaloniki B.C. coaches
KAOD B.C. coaches
Keravnos B.C. coaches
Makedonikos B.C. coaches
Olympia Larissa B.C. coaches
Panelefsiniakos B.C. coaches
Panellinios B.C. coaches
Panionios B.C. coaches
P.A.O.K. BC coaches
Rethymno B.C. coaches
Basketball players from Chania